Perch Proshian (Hovhannes Ter-Arakelian, Ashtarak – 23 November 1907, Baku) was an Armenian writer.

Biography

Proshian was born in a tailor's family in Ashtarak. His education included parish school (1849–52) and a short time in the palatial school of Yerevan. In 1856 he finished the Nersisyan School of Tbilisi, where he formed his national-democratic views. After completing one year of education in Tbilisi's palatial school, Proshian came back to Ashtarak in 1857 and was appointed an inspector of the parish school.

In 1859, Proshian went to Tbilisi, where he taught at the Nersisyan School. From 1879 to 1881 had worked in Ejmiatsin as teachers' inspector. In 1887 had returned to Tbilisi. He died in Baku and was buried in the Armenian Pantheon of Tbilisi.

Museum 
The Museum of Pertch Proshian was founded in 1948, in Ashtarak on the base of his father's house. Today in the museum are more than 2,000 exhibitions. The museum was restored in 2008.

See also

Armenian literature
Armenians in Tbilisi
Nersisyan School

References 

1837 births
1907 deaths
People from Ashtarak
Armenian male poets
19th-century Armenian poets
Burials at Armenian Pantheon of Tbilisi
Nersisian School alumni
19th-century male writers
Armenian people from the Russian Empire